Lost Songs is a compilation album from the alternative rock band Anberlin, released on November 20, 2007. It is a collection of covers, unreleased songs from previous album sessions and acoustic versions.  This album is not entirely all-new, as most of the tracks have previously appeared on special editions of albums or other compilations.

Track listing 
 "The Haunting" (Cities B-Side) - 5:49 
 "Uncanny"  (Cities: Special Edition) - 3:27 
 "Like a Rolling Stone" (Listen to Bob Dylan: A Tribute Album) (Bob Dylan cover) - 3:44 
 "A Day Late (Acoustic)" (Purevolume exclusive) - 4:15 
 "Enjoy the Silence" (Punk Goes 90's Compilation) (Depeche Mode cover) - 3:30 
 "Cadence" (Acoustic) - 3:29 
 "Downtown Song" (Never Take Friendship Personal B-Side) - 2:59 
 "There Is a Light That Never Goes Out" (Cities: Special Edition) (The Smiths cover) - 4:15
 "Dismantle.Repair." (Acoustic) - 4:34 
 "The Promise"  (Cities: Special Edition) (When in Rome cover) - 3:14 
 "Naïve Orleans" (Acoustic) - 3:40
 "Inevitable" (AOL Sessions Under Cover) - 3:46
 "The Unwinding Cable Car" (AOL Sessions Under Cover) - 4:29 
 "Creep" (AOL Sessions Under Cover) (Radiohead cover) - 4:16 
 "Baby Please Come Home" (Happy Christmas Vol. 4 Compilation) - 2:43 
 "Readyfuels" (Demo) - 3:48
 "Driving (Autobahn)" (Demo) - 3:58 
 "Everywhere in Between" (Demo) - 3:29
 "Hidden Track" (Glass to the Arson MIDI) - 3:30

References

External links 
 

Anberlin albums
B-side compilation albums
2007 compilation albums
Tooth & Nail Records compilation albums